Gierałtowice  (German Gieraltowitz) is a village in Gliwice County, Silesian Voivodeship, in southern Poland. It is the seat of the gmina (administrative district) called Gmina Gierałtowice. The village has a population of 3,752.

Coat of Arms
The Coat of Arms is a blue sky with a house, wheat, and crops. At the top it says ‘Gierałtowice’.

Villages in Gliwice County